Hernán Terrazas Céspedes (3 December 1926 – 6 November 2020) was a Bolivian general who served as Mayor of Cochabamba during the era of dictatorships in Bolivia. Early in his military career he was stationed in the Rocha Regiment and, as a second lieutenant, formed part of the rebel lines in Incahuasi during the 1949 coup d'état in Bolivia.

Early military career

Graduation and the Civil War of 1949 
His military career began in the Military College of the Army, located in La Paz, where he was a classmate of future president Hugo Banzer. Being a member of the graduated class of 1948, Terrazas left the Military College with the rank of second lieutenant. Not long after his military career had just begun, Bolivia found itself in a moment of chaos. After the brutal lynching of President Gualberto Villarroel in 1946, the oligarchs of the nation attempted to sideline the Revolutionary Nationalist Movement (MNR) and undo the reforms of the past years. 

The repression that followed would climax in the so-called civil war of 1949. Among the rebel lines, Terrazas backed the MNR and partook in the uprising at Incahuasi. The rebellion was ultimately crushed and, along with many others, he was put in prison. Though the rebellion had come to an end, the oligarchy’s rule over the country remained shaky.  

By 1951, the MNR was again troubling the government. President Mamerto Urriolagoitía, in an attempt to deal with the protest and rebellions, installed general Hugo Ballivián as his successor in a self-coup known as the Mamertazo. The government could not maintain stability and the result was the Bolivian National Revolution of 1952. The echoes of the coup d’état of 1949 resonated within the events of 1952. Finally, the old oligarchic republic overthrown and the MNR in power. The results of 1952 would propel Terrazas’ career to new heights and would lead him to high positions in the future.

Rise of the MNR 
A loyal MNR member even before the coup d’état in 1949, Terrazas would remain loyal to the party for the entirety of his life. It was under the rule of the MNR that The Alliance for Progress, which was the result of increasing American influence in Latin America, led to the Bolivian military to enter into the sphere of influence of the School of the Americas. Terrazas, like many other Latin American military officers, was a graduate and instructor of this institution. In 1961, while he held the rank of Major, he instructed a course at the School of the Americas on the topic of nuclear war. 

Terrazas would also serve as aide-de-camp to President Víctor Paz Estenssoro, the brain behind the Bolivian National Revolution and the leader of the MNR, and was sent to West Germany as military attaché in 1962. This constituted his entry into the world of politics and diplomacy. 

After being promoted to the rank of Colonel, Terrazas served as representative of the Bolivian Armed Forces to the Development Corporation of the Oruro Department. Under his supervision, large parts of the city Oruro were developed and expanded, contributing greatly to improving the infrastructure of a city long overlooked by previous representatives.

Later military career

Return to Bolivia and generalship 

After returning to Bolivia from West Germany, Terrazas would continue his career in the army. His endeavors were successful as he reached the rank of general by 1974. First, he was promoted to Brigadier general in 1974. Later on, he was promoted to Division general by a Supreme Decree signed by Hugo Banzer.

Mayor of Cochabamba 
Not long after Banzer had been ousted by a coup led by Juan Pereda, Terrazas was appointed Mayor of Cochabamba. Terrazas also worked in the development of the town of Torotoro, Bolivia and its infrastructure while he was Mayor of Cochabamba. Participating in such an activity was common at the time and a part of the urban-rural dynamics coming from the major metropolitan center of Cochabamba. However, the unstable political situation of the country at the time eventually forced Terrazas out of office. Not long after this, he had been forcibly retired alongside the majority of generals that worked closely with Banzer. 
As senior officer of the Bolivian Army, Terrazas received the illustrious Brazilian Order of Military Merit on 8 March 1978. Terrazas even served as Chief of Staff of the Bolivian Armed Forces, becoming the second most powerful man in the country during the dictatorship of Hugo Banzer (1971-1978).

Personal life 
Terrazas was married to Beatriz de Alencar, a member of the Alencar family through her grandfather the Baron of Alencar. She was also a descendant of Bárbara de Alencar, the Baron of Alencar's paternal grandmother and a key figure in the independence of Brazil from Portugal. The marriage produced two children, Adolfo (1957) and Patricia (1962). His daughter, Patricia, is married to Rodrigo De Urioste, grandson of the Bolivian industrialist Armando Julio Urioste Arana.

Later life and death 
Later in his life, Terrazas helped author J.J. Benítez in his work El Hombre que susurraba a los «Ummitas» (2007), a novel seeking to answer whether alien life existed.  

Terrazas died of a stroke at his home in La Paz on 6 November 2020, aged 93.

References 

1926 births
2020 deaths
Bolivian generals
Mayors of places in Bolivia
People from Cochabamba Department
Recipients of the Order of Military Merit (Brazil)